In the course of the fictional story presented in the DC Comics event Infinite Crisis (the seven-issue limited series, its lead-in stories, and various tie-ins), several events in the fictional DC Universe's past were retroactively altered by either Superboy-Prime or the separation and re-merging of alternate Earths. Where not otherwise stated, this article deals only with changes known by the end of Infinite Crisis #7.

Superboy-Prime's changes
Superboy-Prime's attempts to punch his way out of the extradimensional space in which he had been trapped since the Crisis on Infinite Earths mini-series, along with Kal-L, Lois Lane (both of Earth-Two), and Alexander Luthor, Jr. (of Earth-Three), triggered "ripples" in the fabric of reality which created parallel timelines, causing pivotal events in the present to be overlapped by alternate versions of them, and thus retroactively establishes him being the creator of Hypertime, introduced since the 1999 story arc The Kingdom. These changes were different for each person affected. Changes include:
 Jason Todd's post-Crisis alteration of his origin and resurrection.
 Elasti-Girl and Negative Man of the Doom Patrol restored to life, the Chief restored to his original body and the team's history rebooted. The team eventually remembered its original history.
 The various origins of Superman.
 The various incarnations of Hawkman.
 The various incarnations of the Legion of Super-Heroes since Crisis on Infinite Earths.
 The various origins of Donna Troy.
 The various origins of the Metal Men.
 Hal Jordan has never been an ex-con who served 90 days in prison for drunk driving.
 The alterations of two details of the Justice League's past of them mind-wiping their foes and Batman in order to keep their secrets hidden and Sue Dibny's rape by Dr. Light.

Multiverse collapse changes
The infinite Earths, which had collapsed into a single world during Crisis on Infinite Earths, diverged again into multiple Earths during Infinite Crisis only to collapse back into a single "New Earth" with a slightly altered history. Examples of the revised history include:
 Joe Chill being arrested for the murder of Thomas Wayne and Martha Wayne, Bruce Wayne's parents.
 Rumors of Superman being active before he first appeared in Metropolis.
 Wonder Woman is a founding member of the Justice League.
 The Justice Society members' memories of the Golden Age Superman are rekindled.
 The various versions of General Zod are replaced by a single version.

Editorial retcons
Some retcons introduced during the Infinite Crisis storyline were the result of editors or writers deciding to revise certain story elements in order to fit a particular story or scenario. Examples include:
 Maxwell Lord was always a villain conspiring against metahumans, and his death and his subsequent transformation into Lord Havok were set aside.

Subsequent continuity changes attributed to Infinite Crisis
Some continuity changes were attributed to Infinite Crisis after it ended, without specifying whether Superboy-Prime or the collapse of the Multiverse caused them. These include:
 Elasti-Girl's resurrection, attributed to Niles Caulder's experimentation.
 Superman's membership in the Legion of Super-Heroes as a teenager, prior to the start of his public superhero career; Legion continuity prior to Crisis on Infinite Earths is substantially restored. However, the "Reboot" and "Threeboot" versions of the Legion remain.
 Queen Hippolyta's Post-Crisis history as the Golden Age Wonder Woman of the 1940s is no longer valid.
 TNT and Dyna-Mite are retconned into the Seven Soldiers of Victory.

Deceased prior to Infinite Crisis, these characters reappeared as if they had never died:
 Francine Langstrom, the wife of the Man-Bat.
 Lynx.
 Magpie.
 Reactron.
 Ventriloquist and Scarface.

See also
 Character changes during Infinite Crisis

References

Continuity (fiction)
Infinite Crisis